This is a list of moths of Brazil about which we have WP articles, giving the evidence needed for their presence in this list.

List 

 Abaera aurofusalis
 Abaera chalcea
 Abaera nactalis
 Acanthodica frigida
 Acanthodica penicillum
 Acarolella obnixa
 Achroosia
 Achyra brasiliensis
 Aclytia apicalis
 Aclytia conjecturalis
 Aclytia flavigutta
 Aclytia mictochroa
 Aclytia terra
 Acrolophus tapuja
 Acylita cara
 Acylita distincta
 Acylita dukinfieldi
 Acylita elongata
 Acylita monosticta
 Acylita sanguifusa
 Adoxosia excisa
 Adoxosia nydiana
 Adullamitis
 Aemilia asignata
 Aemilia pagana
 Aethes austera
 Aethes bicuspis
 Aethes evanida
 Aethes grandaeva
 Aethes jonesi
 Aethes mirifica
 Aethes planaltinae
 Aethes portentosa
 Aethesoides stellans
 Aethiophysa acutipennis
 Aethria melanobasis
 Aethria ornata
 Agaraea klagesi
 Agaraea minuta
 Agaraea nigrotuberata
 Agaraea uniformis
 Agrammia matronalis
 Agylla argentea
 Agylla barbicosta
 Agylla barbipalpia
 Agylla involuta
 Agylla marcata
 Agylla polysemata
 Agylla venosa
 Agyrta albisparsa
 Agyrta pandemia
 Agyrta porphyria
 Agyrtiola
 Aleuron prominens
 Aleuron ypanemae
 Allocryptobia
 Alsodryas deltochlora
 Alsodryas prasinoptila
 Amaxia collaris
 Amaxia consistens
 Amaxia corata
 Amaxia disconsistens
 Amaxia egaensis
 Amaxia flavipuncta
 Amaxia hebe
 Amaxia kennedyi
 Amaxia perapyga
 Amaxia pseudodyuna
 Amaxia pyga
 Amblytenes
 Ammalo violitincta
 Amorbia catarina
 Amorbia chlorolyca
 Amorbia curitiba
 Amorbia elaeopetra
 Amphonyx rivularis
 Anacampsis aedificata
 Anacampsis capyrodes
 Anacampsis diplodelta
 Anacampsis humilis
 Anacampsis idiocentra
 Anacampsis perquisita
 Anacampsis petrographa
 Anacampsis poliombra
 Anacampsis pomaceella
 Anacrusis atrosparsana
 Anacrusis marriana
 Anacrusis rhizosema
 Anacrusis securiferana
 Anacrusis stapiana
 Anadasmus caliginea
 Anadasmus capnocrossa
 Anadasmus endochra
 Anadasmus lithogypsa
 Anaeglis
 Anania ademonalis
 Anania arenacea
 Anania cervinalis
 Anania desistalis
 Anania ferruginealis
 Anania leucocraspia
 Anania lutealis
 Anania monospila
 Anania nerissalis
 Anania nullalis
 Anania otiosalis
 Anarmodia damalis
 Anarmodia inflexalis
 Anarmodia majoralis
 Anarmodia sibilalis
 Antaeotricha cleopatra
 Antaeotricha navicularis
 Antaeotricha nephelocyma
 Antaeotricha neurographa
 Antaeotricha nitescens
 Antaeotricha nitidorella
 Antaeotricha notogramma
 Antaeotricha notosaris
 Antaeotricha ogmolopha
 Antaeotricha orgadopa
 Antaeotricha orthophaea
 Antaeotricha orthriopa
 Antaeotricha pallicosta
 Antaeotricha percnocarpa
 Antaeotricha phaselodes
 Antaeotricha planicoma
 Antaeotricha plesistia
 Antaeotricha praecisa
 Antaeotricha pyrgota
 Antaeotricha pyrobathra
 Antaeotricha refractrix
 Antaeotricha resiliens
 Antaeotricha sciospila
 Antaeotricha sellifera
 Antaeotricha semicinerea
 Antaeotricha semisignella
 Antaeotricha serarcha
 Antaeotricha sterrhomitra
 Antaeotricha stringens
 Antaeotricha stygeropa
 Antaeotricha synercta
 Antaeotricha teleosema
 Antaeotricha tetrapetra
 Antaeotricha tibialis
 Antaeotricha tornogramma
 Antaeotricha tractrix
 Antaeotricha tricapsis
 Antaeotricha tripustulella
 Antaeotricha trisinuata
 Antaeotricha tritogramma
 Antaeotricha umbriferella
 Antaeotricha unisecta
 Antaeotricha xanthopetala
 Antaeotricha xuthosaris
 Anthistarcha binocularis
 Antiblemma leucocyma
 Antona fallax
 Antona immutata
 Antona subluna
 Antona tenuifascia
 Anycles dolosus
 Aphra nyctemeroides
 Aphra trivittata
 Aphyle flavicolor
 Apilocrocis novateutonialis
 Apotoforma epacticta
 Apotoforma viridans
 Araeomolis irregularis
 Archipimima consentanea
 Archipimima cosmoscelis
 Archipimima labyrinthopa
 Archipimima telemaco
 Archipimima vermelhana
 Archips biforatus
 Ardeutica crypsilitha
 Ardeutica emphantica
 Ardeutica semipicta
 Ardonea tenebrosa
 Areva subfulgens
 Areva trigemmis
 Argyractis argentilinealis
 Argyractis berthalis
 Argyractis flavalis
 Argyractis iasusalis
 Argyractis lophosomalis
 Argyractis obliquifascia
 Argyractis subornata
 Argyractis tapajosalis
 Argyractoides catenalis
 Argyria croceivittella
 Argyria divisella
 Argyria lucidellus
 Argyria mesogramma
 Argyria tunuistrigella
 Argyria vesta
 Argyroeides affinis
 Argyroeides braco
 Argyroeides flavicornis
 Argyroeides flavipes
 Argyroeides fuscipes
 Argyroeides magon
 Argyroeides sanguinea
 Argyroeides strigula
 Argyrotaenia albosignata
 Argyrotaenia dearmata
 Argyrotaenia fragosa
 Argyrotaenia hemixia
 Argyrotaenia iopsamma
 Argyrotaenia levidensa
 Argyrotaenia obvoluta
 Argyrotaenia sagata
 Argyrotaenia santacatarinae
 Argyrotaenia telemacana
 Argyrotaenia tristriata
 Aristotelia argyractis
 Aristotelia calculatrix
 Arogalea melitoptila
 Arouva albivitta
 Arouva mirificana
 Arsenura pandora
 Arta bichordalis
 Arta encaustalis
 Arta serialis
 Ascalenia revelata
 Asciodes scopulalis
 Ategumia actealis
 Atomopteryx doeri
 Atyphopsis roseiceps
 Aulacodes adiantealis
 Aulacodes caepiosalis
 Aulacodes chalcialis
 Aulacodes confusalis
 Aulacodes cuprescens
 Aulacodes filigeralis
 Aulacodes gothicalis
 Aulacodes halitalis
 Aulacodes ilialis
 Aulacodes moralis
 Aulacodes pampalis
 Aulacodes scaralis
 Aulacodes semicircularis
 Aulacodes templalis
 Auratonota auriginea
 Auratonota badiaurea
 Auratonota clasmata
 Auratonota exoptata
 Auratonota tessellata
 Aureopteryx calistoalis
 Autochloris completa
 Autochloris ectomelaena
 Autochloris ethela
 Autochloris laennus
 Autochloris nigridior
 Autochloris serra
 Autochloris simplex
 Autochloris solimoes
 Autochloris xanthogastroides
 Avela
 Axiagasta stactogramma
 Azamora pelopsana
 Azamora tortriciformis
 Azatrephes fuliginosa
 Azatrephes orientalis
 Azochis ectangulalis
 Azochis gripusalis
 Azochis pieralis
 Basanasca
 Blastobasis anachasta
 Bleptina caradrinalis
 Bradypophila
 Brithyceros
 Callionima guiarti
 Catadupa integrana
 Catocrocis
 Ceritaenia ceria
 Cervicrambus
 Chionodes spirodoxa
 Chromodes
 Cibyra spitzi
 Clarkeulia dubia
 Clarkeulia excerptana
 Coiffaitarctia ockendeni
 Colpocrita
 Compsocrita
 Compsolechia drachmaea
 Crambus delineatellus
 Crambus multiradiellus
 Crambus patulellus
 Crambus whalleyi
 Cratoplastis barrosi
 Crepidochares subtigrina
 Cronicombra granulata
 Cununcus phylarchus
 Cyclidalis
 Cyclophora anaisaria
 Cyclophora angeronaria
 Cyclophora annularis
 Cyclophora antennaria
 Cyclophora argenticristata
 Cyclophora argyromyces
 Cyclophora arthura
 Cyclophora bizaria
 Cyclophora carolina
 Cyclophora castraria
 Cyclophora mossi
 Cyclophora stella
 Cyclophora zeuctospila
 Dalaca guarani
 Dalaca katharinae
 Dalaca mummia
 Dastira
 Derbeta
 Desmia extrema
 Desmia intermicalis
 Desmia jonesalis
 Desmia lacrimalis
 Desmia melanalis
 Desmia odontoplaga
 Desmia paucimaculalis
 Desmia pisusalis
 Desmia strigivitralis
 Diloxis
 Drepanodia
 Duboisvalia simulans
 Dunama ravistriata
 Dysschema tricolora
 Echeta juno
 Echeta semirosea
 Elophila fulvalis
 Elysius amapaensis
 Elysius discopunctata
 Elysius flavoabdominalis
 Elysius intensa
 Elysius intensus
 Elysius itaunensis
 Elysius jonesi
 Elysius meridionalis
 Elysius ordinaria
 Elysius pyrosticta
 Elysius systron
 Eois amaryllaria
 Eois bifilata
 Eois brasiliensis
 Eois carnana
 Eois chione
 Eois contractata
 Eois glauculata
 Eois hermosaria
 Eois hyperythraria
 Eois mictographa
 Eois neutraria
 Eois nigriplaga
 Eois olivaria
 Eois platearia
 Eois semipicta
 Eois signaria
 Eois singularia
 Eois subangulata
 Eois tegularia
 Eois telegraphica
 Eois veniliata
 Epermenia brasiliana
 Erbessa integra
 Eriostepta sanguinea
 Eucereon leucophaea
 Eucereon scyton
 Eucereon varia
 Euchromius minutus
 Eugonosia
 Eupithecia gaumaria
 Eupithecia helenaria
 Fernandocrambus diabolicus
 Fissicrambus artos
 Geropaschia
 Glaucosia
 Glaucostola guttipalpis
 Glyphipterix atelura
 Glyphipterix hologramma
 Glyphipterix invicta
 Glyphipterix platyochra
 Glyphipterix voluptella
 Glyphipterix zalodisca
 Goya simulata
 Haemaphlebiella formona
 Hapalonoma sublustricella
 Helcystogramma cerinura
 Helcystogramma chalybea
 Helcystogramma chalyburga
 Helcystogramma rusticella
 Helcystogramma selectella
 Helcystogramma subvectella
 Helcystogramma thesmiopa
 Hellinsia calais
 Hellinsia glochinias
 Hellinsia oxyntes
 Hellinsia palmatus
 Hellinsia paramoi
 Hellinsia paraochracealis
 Hellinsia stadias
 Hellinsia zetes
 Herpetogramma circumflexalis
 Herpetogramma infuscalis
 Herpetogramma schausi
 Herpetogramma servalis
 Heterauge
 Homura nocturnalis
 Hypidota
 Idneodes
 Imara satrapes
 Imma chloromelalis
 Imma eriospila
 Imma metachlora
 Imma quadrivittana
 Imma thymora
 Itambe fenestalis
 Jocara cristalis
 Lamprosema canacealis
 Lamprosema distentalis
 Lamprosema semicostalis
 Lineodes fontella
 Lithopsaestis
 Loxotoma seminigrens
 Manduca diffissa
 Marisba
 Mellamastus
 Melora amygdaloides
 Mesopediasia hemixanthellus
 Mesopediasia psyche
 Metallocrates
 Microcrambus arcas
 Microcrambus cyllarus
 Microcrambus grisetinctellus
 Microcrambus hector
 Microcrambus paucipunctellus
 Microzancla
 Moca albodiscata
 Moca nipharcha
 Moca niphostoma
 Moca pelomacta
 Moca roscida
 Moca vexatalis
 Molopostola calumnias
 Monachozela neoleuca
 Neoculladia incanellus
 Neotheora
 Oectoperodes
 Oncolabis
 Opharus intermedia
 Opharus nigrocinctus
 Opharus notata
 Opharus rema
 Ophias
 Oryctopleura
 Oxyelophila lanceolalis
 Palpita braziliensis
 Palpita forficifera
 Palpita persimilis
 Palpita seitzialis
 Palpita travassosi
 Palpita trifurcata
 Parapediasia atalanta
 Parapediasia cervinellus
 Parapediasia murinellus
 Parapediasia paranella
 Patania silicalis
 Pedaliotis
 Petrophila aengusalis
 Petrophila constellalis
 Phanerozela polydora
 Phostria albirenalis
 Phostria delilalis
 Phostria euagra
 Phostria persiusalis
 Phostria phryganurus
 Phostria samealis
 Phostria varialis
 Piletocera albicilialis
 Pilocrocis dentilinealis
 Pilocrocis gillippusalis
 Pilocrocis lactealis
 Podalia walkeri
 Polygrammodes compositalis
 Polygrammodes dubialis
 Polygrammodes eaclealis
 Polygrammodes farinalis
 Polygrammodes herminealis
 Polygrammodes klagesi
 Polygrammodes leucalis
 Polygrammodes maccalis
 Polygrammodes nervosa
 Polygrammodes obscuridiscalis
 Polygrammodes obsoletalis
 Polygrammodes ostrealis
 Polygrammodes ponderalis
 Polygrammodes runicalis
 Polygrammodes semirufa
 Polygrammodes supremalis
 Polypsecta
 Pseudohemihyalea klagesi
 Pseudosphex spitzi
 Pycnarmon deicoonalis
 Pycnarmon juanalis
 Pycnarmon mallaleuca
 Pyrausta fieldialis
 Pyrausta flavibrunnealis
 Pyrausta haemapastalis
 Pyrausta phaeophoenica
 Pyrausta pyrocausta
 Pyrausta staiusalis
 Pyrausta suavidalis
 Pyrausta subinquinalis
 Recurvaria insequens
 Recurvaria intermissella
 Recurvaria penetrans
 Recurvaria pleurosaris
 Recurvaria saxea
 Rhodographa
 Scirpophaga terrella
 Scopula abornata
 Scopula albidulata
 Scopula conotaria
 Scopula dismutata
 Scopula donaria
 Scopula micara
 Scopula obliviaria
 Scopula oliveta
 Scopula recusataria
 Scopula rubrocinctata
 Scopula subquadrata
 Scopula timboensis
 Scopula unicornata
 Scopula vinocinctata
 Scopula xanthocephalata
 Setiarcha
 Spinivalva
 Spinulata discopuncta
 Stilbosis argyritis
 Syllepte amissalis
 Syllepte belialis
 Syllepte brunnescens
 Syllepte cyanea
 Syllepte dioptalis
 Syllepte pactolalis
 Syllepte philetalis
 Syllepte striginervalis
 Tiquadra crocidura
 Tiquadra drapetica
 Tiquadra exercitata
 Tiquadra nivosa
 Tiquadra reversella
 Tiquadra syntripta
 Tiquadra vilis
 Tortriculladia argentimaculalis
 Tortriculladia pentaspila
 Trichophassus
 Triclonella aglaogramma
 Triclonella albicellata
 Triclonella calyptrodes
 Triclonella chionozona
 Triclonella citrocarpa
 Triclonella cruciformis
 Triclonella diglypta
 Triclonella trachyxyla
 Tricypha obscura
 Tricypha ochrea
 Trierostola
 Zatrephes miniata
 Zonochares

References

Lepidoptera of Brazil
Moths
Brazil
Brazil
Brazil